The 1994–95 Dallas Stars season was the 28th season in franchise history and the second in Dallas, Texas. Injuries to forward Mike Modano caused him to miss 18 games, more than a third of the 48-game regular season, and finished with 29 points (12 goals, 17 assists). As a result, the Stars didn't have the same offensive power they had had in 1993–94, when Modano scored a career-high 50 goals and relied on Dave Gagner to pick up the slack, which he did, leading the team in goals, assists and points. Despite finishing the season on a 4-game losing streak for a 17-23-8 record, Dallas still scored more goals (136) than they allowed (135).

Offseason

Regular season
The Stars tied the Hartford Whalers and the Toronto Maple Leafs for the lowest shooting percentage during the Regular season, with just 135 goals on 1,520 shots (8.9%)

Final standings

Schedule and results

Playoffs
Despite having a 17-23-8 record, the Stars clinched the number eight seed in the Western Conference, thus making the playoffs for the second consecutive year. They lost to Detroit in the first round 4–1.

Player statistics

Regular season
Scoring

Goaltending

Playoffs
Scoring

Goaltending

Note: Pos = Position; GP = Games played; G = Goals; A = Assists; Pts = Points; +/- = plus/minus; PIM = Penalty minutes; PPG = Power-play goals; SHG = Short-handed goals; GWG = Game-winning goals
      MIN = Minutes played; W = Wins; L = Losses; T = Ties; GA = Goals-against; GAA = Goals-against average; SO = Shutouts; SA = Shots against; SV = Shots saved; SV% = Save percentage;

Transactions
April 7, 1995: RW Russ Courtnall traded from Dallas to Vancouver for LW Greg Adams and RW Dan Kesa and Vancouver's fifth round pick in 1995 Entry Draft.

Draft picks

References
 Stars on Hockey Database

D
D
1994